Macrocoma apicicornis is a species of leaf beetle found in Zimbabwe, Tanzania and the Democratic Republic of the Congo. It was first described from Mashonaland by Martin Jacoby in 1897.

References 

apicicornis
Beetles of Africa
Beetles of the Democratic Republic of the Congo
Insects of Zimbabwe
Insects of Tanzania
Taxa named by Martin Jacoby